This page lists the winners and nominees for the Black Reel Award for Outstanding Film Poster.  This category was retired during the 2004 ceremony.

Winners and nominees
Winners are listed first and highlighted in bold.

2000s

References

Black Reel Awards